Seventh Day'Vonte Woods (born August 7, 1998) is an American basketball player. He played college basketball for the North Carolina Tar Heels, South Carolina Gamecocks and Morgan State Bears.

Early life
Woods was born on August 7, 1998, in Columbia, South Carolina. Woods is the youngest of four brothers and started playing basketball when he was four years old.

High school career
Seventh Woods started on the Hammond School varsity basketball team in the 8th grade when he was only 13 years old. As an 8th grader, he averaged 14.6 points per game. As a freshman, Woods averaged 19.3 points per game and earned the Hammond basketball player of the year, aiding his team to a 22–5 record and the SCISA Class AAA state championship game. Woods gained national notoriety from a viral Hoopmixtape montage titled "Seventh Woods Is The BEST 14 Year Old In The Country! CRAZY Athlete," still the most viewed video in the page's history .
His sophomore season, he averaged 20 points per game, while also averaging 4 steals, 3.8 assists, and 3.6 rebounds and earned the South Carolina boys basketball player of the year and was selected for the U16 USA National Team. His team went 5–0 and won the U16 Championship.
As a junior in 2014–15, Woods averaged 16.3 points, 3.5 rebounds, 3.7 assists, and 3.6 steals per game while leading Hammond to a state championship in 2015. After the conclusion of his junior season, Woods joined his AAU team, Carolina Wolves on the Under Armour Association Circuit. Woods averaged 16.9 Points per game and 3.5 Assists per game on the Under Armour Association Circuit. Woods also played in the Elite 24 Invitational game in Brooklyn, New York in the summer of 2015. As a senior in 2015–16, he averaged 18.9 points per game, 4.5 rebounds per game, 5.0 assists per game and 3.5 steals per game. Named a 4-star recruit by ESPN, Woods at that time was ranked 54th in the nation and 14th among points guards in the Class of 2016.

Woods was heavily recruited by the universities of North Carolina and South Carolina, and signed with North Carolina on November 11, 2014.

College career

North Carolina
As a freshman, Woods played in all 40 games, tying a school record. He averaged nearly eight minutes per game, mainly in relief to the starting point guard Joel Berry. He had his best game of the season against Duke, where he scored four points and lead the team with four assists.

In his sophomore year, Woods was limited by a stress fracture in his foot; he missed 17 games due to the injury. Before his injury, he tied his career-high in scoring with nine points in the season opener against Northern Iowa.

During the offseason, Woods was in a competition for the starting point guard role with Coby White, but did not get the job. In his junior season, Woods started one game against UNCW when White was out with an ankle injury. He had the best game of his college career when UNC got a signature win over Gonzaga, who at the time was ranked fourth in the country. He set a new career-high in scoring with 14 points. On April 25, 2019, Woods announced that he would transfer from North Carolina.

South Carolina
On June 7, 2019, Woods announced he would transfer to South Carolina. He started 13 games and averaged 5.4 points, 1.7 rebounds, 1.9 assists, and 1.1 steals per game as a senior.

Morgan State
On June 21, 2021, Woods announced he was transferring to Morgan State for his final season of eligibility. He started 18 games and averaged 4.7 points, 2.0 rebounds, 2.1 assists, and 0.6 steals per game.

Career statistics

College

|-
| style="text-align:left;"| 2016–17
| style="text-align:left;"| North Carolina
| style="background:#cfecec;"| 40* || 0 || 7.7 || .283 || .182 || .610 || 1.4 || 1.2 || .5 || .1 || 1.5
|-
| style="text-align:left;"| 2017–18
| style="text-align:left;"| North Carolina
| 20 || 0 || 7.0 || .300 || .000 || .800 || .7 || 1.0 || .3 || .1 || 1.1
|-
| style="text-align:left;"| 2018–19
| style="text-align:left;"| North Carolina
| 34 || 1 || 10.8 || .419 || .400 || .643 || 1.0 || 2.1 || .9 || .1 || 2.5
|-
| style="text-align:left;"| 2019–20
| style="text-align:left;"| South Carolina
| style="text-align:center;" colspan="11"|  Redshirt
|-
| style="text-align:left;"| 2020–21
| style="text-align:left;"| South Carolina
| 18 || 13 || 19.0 || .368 || .185 || .667 || 1.7 || 1.9 || 1.1 || .1 || 5.4
|- class="sortbottom"
| style="text-align:center;" colspan="2"| Career
| 112 || 14 || 10.3 || .356 || .212 || .640 || 1.2 || 1.6 || .7 || .1 || 2.4

References

External links
Morgan State Bears bio
South Carolina Gamecocks bio
North Carolina Tar Heels bio
USA Basketball bio

1998 births
Living people
21st-century African-American sportspeople
African-American basketball players
American men's basketball players
Basketball players from Columbia, South Carolina
Morgan State Bears men's basketball players
North Carolina Tar Heels men's basketball players
Point guards
Shooting guards
South Carolina Gamecocks men's basketball players